Turin is the capital city of the Metropolitan City of Turin and the Piedmont Region, in north-west Italy. Turin may also refer to the following:

Places
Turin, Alberta, Canada; a hamlet
Turin, Idlib, Syria; a village
Turín, El Salvador, town in the Ahuachapán Department

Italy
 Province of Turin, former province in the Piedmont region of Italy
 March of Turin, a Medieval country around the city of Turin
 Roman Catholic Archdiocese of Turin, Italy
 Metropolitan City of Turin

United States
Turin, Georgia
Turin, Iowa
Turin, New York
Turin (village), New York
Turin Township, Michigan

People
 Turin, or Tarin, alternative spellings for the Pashtun tribe Tareen
 Duke of Turin

Persons
 Dave Turin, a gold miner featured in the Gold Rush television series
George L. Turin (1930-2014) U.S. computer scientist
John J. Turin (1913-1973), American physicist
Luca Turin (b. 1953), biophysicist and proponent of the vibration theory of olfaction
Mark Turin (b. 1973), linguistic anthropologist
Niels Turin Nielsen (1887-1964) Danish gymnast

Fictional characters
Túrin Turambar, a character in J. R. R. Tolkien's Middle-earth

Facilities and structures
Turin Airport (disambiguation)
Refuge Turin, a high mountain refuge
Turin Cathedral, Turin, Italy
Observatory of Turin, astronomical observatory
International University College of Turin, Turin, Italy
The Turin, NYC, NYS, USA; an apartment building

Events
Battle of Turin (disambiguation) including Siege of Turin
Turin Auto Show, notable automobile show held in Turin, Italy, from 1900–2000
Turin International, 1911 World's Fair
2006 Winter Olympics (Torino 2006) Turin, Italy
2006 Winter Paralympics (Torino 2006) Turin, Italy

Other uses
Treaty of Turin (disambiguation)
Shroud of Turin, cloth that allegedly covered the dead Jesus of Nazareth
Turin, an alternative name for the Italian wine grape Dolcetto and the French wine grape Douce noir
Turin King List, list of ancient pharaohs

See also

Turin, New York (disambiguation)

Torino (disambiguation)